Introns is a remix album by the American rock band LCD Soundsystem, released in March 2006 through DFA as a digital download. It is a compilation of B-sides and remixes from the band's eponymous debut album and associated singles. The cover image shows James Murphy's record collection.

Three of the tracks are from a session recorded for London radio station Xfm. The session version of "Slowdive", a Siouxsie and the Banshees cover, was originally on the "Disco Infiltrator" single.

Track listing

References

LCD Soundsystem albums
2006 remix albums
DFA Records remix albums